Yang Chien-fu (born 22 April 1979 in Taitung County, Taiwan) is a Taiwanese professional baseball pitcher.

Career
After serving in the National Training Team in 2001 and 2002 he was drafted by the Sinon Bulls of the Chinese Professional Baseball League in early 2003 and stays at that club to date. Yang is well known for his slider and had a fastball speed up to 152 km/h (94 mph) in his heyday in 2004, as well as being a frequent member of the Taiwan national baseball team since 2001. However between 2005 and 2007 his elbow injury and the overall poor condition of the Sinon Bulls compromised his performance. He became a free agent at the end of 2011 season.

Career statistics

See also
Chinese Taipei at the 2004 Summer Olympics
2006 Intercontinental Cup
Sinon Bulls
2007 CPBL season

External links
CPBL Page (traditional Chinese)
Official Personal Website

1979 births
2006 World Baseball Classic players
2017 World Baseball Classic players
Asian Games medalists in baseball
Asian Games silver medalists for Chinese Taipei
Baseball players at the 2004 Summer Olympics
Baseball players at the 2008 Summer Olympics
Baseball players at the 2010 Asian Games
EDA Rhinos players
Living people
Medalists at the 2010 Asian Games
Olympic baseball players of Taiwan
Taiwanese baseball players
People from Taitung County
Sinon Bulls players